Edvin Leonard Hugo Endre (born ) is a Swedish actor, best known for his role as 'Mister' in the 2013 Swedish comedy film Studentfesten. From 2014 to 2016, he played the recurring character Erlendur, son of King Horik, in the historical drama television series Vikings.

In 2016, Endre portrayed Matti Nykänen, a former world champion Finnish ski jumper in the British biographical sports film Eddie the Eagle. In 2018, he played the role of Semigallian Duke Namejs in the historical fiction action film The Pagan King.

Background
Endre is the son of Swedish actress Lena Endre and actor and former footballer Thomas Hanzon.

Filmography

Film
The Hidden Child (2013), young Axel
Eddie the Eagle (2016), Matti Nykänen
The Pagan King (2018), Nameisis

Television
Vikings (2014–2016), Prince Erlendur
Fortitude (2017-2018), Rune Lennox
Idaten (2019), Daniel
Moominvalley (2019), Snufkin (voice)
The Playlist (2022), Daniel Ek

References

External links

1994 births
Living people
Swedish male film actors
Swedish male television actors